Balimo Urban LLG is a local-level government (LLG) of Western Province, Papua New Guinea. It is served by Balimo Airport.

Wards
80. Balimo Urban

References

Local-level governments of Western Province (Papua New Guinea)